Abda was bishop of Edessa. He is commemorated as a saint by the Syriac Orthodox Church in the Martyrology of Rabban Sliba, and his feast day is 16 February. The French scholar Jean Maurice Fiey notes there are two bishops of Edessa of the same name listed by Michael the Syrian's Chronicle, of whom neither have any notable actions or precise dates with which to identify them by.

References

Bibliography

Year of birth missing
Year of death missing
Christian saints in unknown century
Bishops of Edessa
Syriac Orthodox Church saints